Ribeirão Branco is a municipality in the state of São Paulo in Brazil. The population is 16,211 (2020 est.) in an area of 697.5 km2. The elevation is 875 m.

References

Municipalities in São Paulo (state)